Masque of the Red Death is an anthology album by avant-garde musician Diamanda Galás, released on 1 December 1988 by Mute Records. It comprises three studio albums previously issued only on LP: The Divine Punishment, Saint of the Pit and You Must Be Certain of the Devil.

Track listing

Release history

References

External links 
 

Diamanda Galás albums
2003 compilation albums
Mute Records compilation albums